EMI Films was a British film studio and distributor. A subsidiary of the EMI conglomerate, the corporate name was not used throughout the entire period of EMI's involvement in the film industry, from 1969 to 1986, but the company's brief connection with Metro-Goldwyn-Mayer and Anglo-EMI, the division under Nat Cohen, and the later company as part of the Thorn EMI conglomerate (following the merger with Thorn) are outlined here.

History

Headed by Bryan Forbes 
The company was formed after the takeover of Associated British Picture Corporation (ABPC) in 1969 by EMI, following the acquisition of Warner Bros.' shares in ABPC the previous year. At the time ABPC owned 270 ABC Cinemas, a half share in the ITV contractor Thames Television, Elstree Studios at Shenley Road, and had recently bought Anglo-Amalgamated, a film studio in which Nat Cohen had been a partner.

EMI moved into film production with the foundation of a new company, EMI-Elstree. Bernard Delfont appointed writer-director Bryan Forbes as the head of production at Elstree in April 1969 for three years at £40,000 a year, plus a percentage of the profits. As part of the general shake up of EMI, Nat Cohen was appointed to the Board.

EMI announced they would make 28 films for $36 million – 13 of these would be from Cohen's unit for £7 million, the rest from Forbes'. Bernard Delfont called it "probably the most ambitious program ever undertaken by a British film company."

Forbes announced his intention to make a variety of films at Elstree, steering away from what he called the "pornography of violence." He claimed EMI would make 14 films in 18 months with such stars as Peter Sellers and Roger Moore at a cost of £5–10 million in total. His aim was to keep budgets down and create a varied slate which would increase the chances of appealing to audiences and making a sufficient return to continue productions.

Forbes soon announced his slate of projects, including: 
 Hoffman (with Peter Sellers, directed by Alvin Rakoff),
 The Go-Between directed by Joseph Losey, 
 The Breaking of Bumbo directed by Kevin Brownlow and Andrew Mollo, 
 The Feathers of Death directed by Richard Attenborough from a story by Simon Raven (unproduced), 
 a film of a script by Richard Condon, 
 an adaptation of The Railway Children directed by Lionel Jeffries, 
 A Fine and Private Place, directed by Paul Watson
 Dulcima directed by Frank Nesbitt with John Mills,
 Forbrush and the Penguins.

"This is the first serious effort to revitalize the British film industry in 20 years", said Forbes. He added, "We intend to give youth a chance and not merely pay lip service to it. This is our first program and it won't be our last."

However, the first few films of Forbes' regime actually performed poorly commercially: Eyewitness, Hoffmann, And Soon the Darkness and The Man Who Haunted Himself (starring Moore). The Breaking of Bumbo (all 1970), and Mr. Forbush and the Penguins (1971) flopped and A Fine and Private Place was abandoned. Forbes clashed with Bernard Delfont and their American backers, in this case Columbia, over the artistic and commercial value of director Joseph Losey's film The Go-Between (1970). Forbes was also criticised within EMI for directing his own film, The Raging Moon (US: Long Ago, Tomorrow, 1971). The Railway Children (1970) and Tales of Beatrix Potter (1971) were  Forbes' only hits.

The company was affected with labour problems. Forbes felt as though he did not have the support of the EMI board, arguing that he never had the funds to market his films, in contrast with those available to Anglo-EMI, which was headed by Nat Cohen.

Forbes resigned in March 1971, after committing himself to a no-redundancy policy. He had made eleven films in total for an estimated cost of £4 million. Although Forbes' regime was seen at the time to have been a commercial failure, he later claimed that by 1993 his £4 million program of films had eventually brought EMI a profit of £16 million.

Among the films Forbes wished to make but was unable to during his time at Elstree were adaptations of The Living Room, the play by Graham Greene to be directed by Michael Powell; a musical about the Bernado Boys; and The Loud, Loud Silence a post-apocalyptic story from Richard Condon. He turned down Ned Kelly (1970) because its projected budget was too high.

MGM-EMI 
In April 1970, EMI struck up a co-production agreement with Metro-Goldwyn-Mayer. The Hollywood studio announced they would sell their Borehamwood facility ("MGM-British Studios") and move their equipment to EMI's Elstree studio. MGM and EMI would then distribute and produce films in co-operation through a joint venture to be called MGM-EMI. and MGM began to finance some of EMI's productions. EMI's studio complex was renamed EMI-MGM Elstree Studios while a film distribution company MGM-EMI Distributors Ltd. was formed as part of the co-production agreement. This company, headed by Mike Havas would handle domestic distribution of MGM and EMI-produced films in the United Kingdom.

It was originally announced that MGM-EMI would make six to eight films a year, but they ended up producing far fewer. Forbes was given the title of managing director of MGM-EMI to add to his existing title of head of production. In July 1970 MGM-EMI announced they would make four co-productions: The Go-Between, Get Carter, The Boyfriend and The Last Run directed by John Boorman. Of these only the last was not made.

MGM pulled out of the amalgamation in 1973, and became a member of CIC, which took over international distribution of MGM produced films. At this point the distribution company became EMI Film Distributors Ltd., and EMI-MGM Elstree Studios reverted to EMI-Elstree Studios.

Anglo-EMI Film Distributors 
EMI's other filmmaking division, Anglo-EMI Film Distributors Ltd, which had come out of Anglo-Amalgamated, was run autonomously by Nat Cohen. This wing of the company had released films such as Percy (1971). They also financed and distributed a series of films made by Hammer Film Productions, which partly came about through Bernard Delfont's friendship with James Carreras.

Nat Cohen took over Forbes' responsibilities as head of production after his resignation in 1971. Cohen backed productions intended for international success, and EMI had a more obviously commercial outlook. In October 1971, EMI's chairman John Read admitted the film division had performed disappointingly. "Profits were negligible last year and we felt it was desirable to make one or two provisions to write off some of the costs." However films like On the Buses and Up Pompeii (both 1971) performed well in relation to their budgets. "The experts say you're doing well if you make money out of one in three films", said Read. "We see filmmaking as a significant profit earner in the future."

Cohen was responsible for overseeing about 70% of the films produced in the UK during 1973, following a significant decline in domestic projects overall. In particular, long-term duopoly rival Rank had by now greatly reduced its own investment in British film production to a token presence. Cohen was not unaware of the problems inherent in his dominant position. Meanwhile, dependent on support from the most profitable parts of EMI, the company's financial position meant that they had to avoid backing any risky productions.

In May 1973, Cohen announced a £3 million production slate of movies including an adaptation of Swallows and Amazons (1974) and a sequel to Alfie (1966) released as Alfie Darling (1975).

The greatest success of Cohen's regime was Murder on the Orient Express (1974), which Cohen later claimed was the first British movie fully financed by a British company to reach the top of the American box office charts.

In July 1975, Cohen announced a £6 million programme of new films, including Seven Nights in Japan and To the Devil a Daughter (both 1976). These were not particularly successful.

Cohen resigned as chairman on 31 December 1977.

Michael Deeley and Barry Spikings 
In May 1976, the company purchased British Lion Films and the two men who ran British Lion, Michael Deeley and Barry Spikings, became joint managing directors of EMI Distributors, with Nat Cohen remaining as chairman and chief executive. They also joined the EMI board, headed by Bernard Delfont.

Deeley and Spiking's method was to only make a film if at least half the budget was put up by an American studio, reducing their financial risk although making the studio's product less obviously British. They focused on movies with international appeal – i.e. action films – and major stars. The initial Deeley-Spikings slate included three films shot in the US, with $18 million in all" The Deer Hunter, Convoy and The Driver (all 1978). They also made three British-based films, Death on the Nile (1978), Warlords of Atlantis (1978) and Sweeney 2 (1978). Films announced by not made include The Last Gun and Chinese Bandit.

EMI also signed an agreement to invest $5 million in Columbia films. They picked Close Encounters of the Third Kind, The Deep and The Greatest (all 1977). Muhammad Ali played himself in the last of these.

In July 1976, EMI bought Roger Gimbel's production company, Tomorrow Enterprises, and formed EMI Television, headed by Gimbel. They made a large number of American TV movies like The Amazing Howard Hughes (1977) and Deadman's Curve (1978).

EMI backed out of funding Monty Python's Life of Brian (1979) at the last moment, after Bernard Delfont read the script and objected to its treatment of religion.

In April 1978, EMI announced they would make films with the newly formed Orion Pictures, including Arabian Adventure (1979) and other projects.

Michael Deeley left EMI in 1979 but Barry Spikings remained in charge of film production.

Spikings, AFD and Thorn-EMI merger 
Spikings announced a slate of films under his auspices: The Jazz Singer with Neil Diamond, The Elephant Man (both 1980), Honky Tonk Freeway (1981) Franco Zeffirelli's biopic of Maria Callas, Discoland, The Awakening, and The Knight directed by Ridley Scott.

Delfont created a new company, Associated Film Distribution, to distribute films of EMI and ITC Entertainment, then controlled by Lew Grade, his brother. EMI's film division was renamed Thorn EMI Screen Entertainment, to reflect EMI's merger with Thorn Electrical Industries to become Thorn EMI in 1979.

In March 1980, EMI were only making one film in Britain The Mirror Crack'd, which was released at the end of the year, but was a box-office failure. Lord Delfont announced that the company had purchased two British scripts, The Defense by John Mortimer and Off the Record by Frederick Forsyth. He admitted that sixty percent of the company's film budget would be spent in America the following year but "100% of the profits would come to this country... We have got to make films we believe are international, to get the money to bring exports back to this country."

In February 1981, Barry Spikings announced a slate of films worth £70 million, including Honky Tonk Freeway, Memoirs of a Survivor, Comrades and The Knight (a Walter Hill film). The latter was not made.

In March 1981, Spikings admitted AFD has not "gotten off to a flying start" and would be wound up, with Universal taking over distribution of EMI Films. He argued that "production and distribution are not linked" and pointed to the five Oscars that EMI films had earned. In particular, Can't Stop the Music (1980), Honky Tonk Freeway, and Raise the Titanic (1980) had been box-office failures.

Also in 1981, Thorn EMI entered the fast-growing home video market as Thorn EMI Video, featuring an initial line-up of 14 titles (The Tubes Video, April Wine Live in London, I Am a Dancer, Can't Stop the Music, Times Square, Death on the Nile, The Cruel Sea, The Day the Earth Caught Fire, The Best of Benny Hill, Scars of Dracula, Sophia Loren: Her Own Story, S.O.S. Titanic, The Royal Wedding, and Queen: Greatest Flix). The division was primarily active in both the UK and the US, as well as in Australia. In addition to Thorn EMI's own material, the division licensed titles from other companies, mostly those who had no home video division at the time, including New Line Cinema, Orion Pictures, Carolco Pictures and Hemdale Film Corporation.

Verity Lambert 
In January 1983, Barry Spikings left the company and Verity Lambert was appointed head of production. Gary Dartnall became executive chairman. Lambert's first slate was Slayground, Comfort and Joy, Illegal Aliens (which became Morons from Outer Space) and Dreamchild. Lambert said they aimed to make five films a year ranging in budget from $5 to $10 million.

On 1 March 1983, EMI Films filed a lawsuit against United Artists, whereas EMI would finance WarGames, and UA would receive North American rights, while EMI received international rights to the film and pay $4.5 million delivery.

November 1984 saw Thorn EMI Video's US division form a partnership with pay television company HBO; the company then became known as Thorn EMI/HBO Video. The deal saw HBO take a stake in the venture and contribute their own productions for video distribution.

In December 1984, Thorn EMI offered investors the chance to invest in several films by issuing £36 million worth of shares. The films were A Passage to India (1984), Morons from Outer Space, Dreamchild, Wild Geese II and The Holcroft Covenant (all 1985).

In March 1985, Thorn-EMI announced they would set up a production fund worth $175 million to make around twenty films. Film Finance Director John Reiss said the fund would be used as loans for filmmakers or to invest in films budgeted around $13–14 million. Reiss said that the films would be made for international audiences. On 15 May 1985, Thorn EMI Screen Entertainment made an agreement with Gladden Entertainment Corporation whereas Thorn EMI would release Gladden's films for international theatrical distribution.

Lambert resigned in July 1985. After this TESE wound down its in-house production arm and relied on films from independent outfits. That month, TESE signed a deal with French distributor AAA for a 30-month output of the entire British film library, serving 20 films, and did not want to cover all home video rights. On August 6, 1985, Thorn EMI Screen Entertainment agreed deals with various production outfits such as John Bradbourne and Richard Goodwin, Jeremy Thomas, Euan Lloyd and Chris Chrisafis, Verity Lambert and Simon Perry in order to gave the independent outfits "complete freedom" to develop motion pictures. The last films made under Lambert's watch were Clockwise and Link.

On 20 August 1985, Thorn EMI Screen Entertainment and Universal Pictures, which was distributing EMI's films ever since 1981 after acquiring Associated Film Distribution elected to dissolve the U.S. partnership by mutual consent.

Lambert recalled  in 1997: "the person who hired me left, and the person who came in didn't want to produce films and didn't want me. While I managed to make some films I was proud of... Dreamchild, and Clockwise... it was terribly tough and not a very happy experience. But I was determined to see out my three-year contract. By the end I'd had enough of corporate life and wanted to see what I could do as an independent."

Denouement 
In November 1985, Thorn EMI Screen Entertainment was placed up for sale with interested buyers including the Rank Organization, The Cannon Group, publishing empire Robert Maxwell, Heron Communications, and a management buyout led by Gary Dartnall. The following month, in December 1985, it accepted a £110 million ($161.7 million) management offer to place the entire Thorn EMI Screen Entertainment division up for sale. The company's division, British Lion Film Productions Ltd., which EMI bought in 1976, and all trademarks of the British Lion name, which was divested to a former staffer of the company, Peter Snell, of Britannic Film & Television.

In April 1986, Thorn EMI sold its film production and distribution arm (Thorn EMI Screen Entertainment), home video (Thorn EMI Video), and cinema (ABC Cinemas) operations to businessman Alan Bond. Bond, in turn, sold it to The Cannon Group a week later. A year after the purchase, a cash-strapped Cannon sold most of the film library to Weintraub Entertainment Group. They also sold their stake in the video venture inherited from Thorn EMI (which had been renamed as HBO/Cannon Video in the meantime), resulting in HBO running the video label alone from that point forward.

The library passed through the hands of several companies over the following years and is now owned by StudioCanal, a former sister company to Universal Music Group and parent company Canal+ Group's acquisition of European cinema operator UGC who acquired the library's then-owner, the United Kingdom-based Lumiere Pictures and Television in 1996, via Cannon Films. EMI Films also owned Elstree Studios in Hertfordshire, England; in turn, Cannon ended up purchasing the studio as well, but later sold it to Brent Walker in 1988, who in turn ended up selling half of the EMI Elstree Studios site to Tesco for a supermarket, before Hertsmere Council eventually acquired what was left of the Elstree Studios, and, as of 2018, continues to operate it as a film and television studios centre.

Select filmography 
EMI financed films under several names and with a series of production partners. Below are the main ones:

Bryan Forbes 
 Eyewitness (1970) (ABPC) (ITC)
 And Soon the Darkness (1970) (ABPC)
 Hoffman (1970) (ABPC)
 The Man Who Haunted Himself (1970) (ABPC)
 The Breaking of Bumbo (1970) (ABPC)
 The Railway Children (1970)
 A Fine and Private Place (1970) (abandoned)
 The Raging Moon (1971)
 The Tales of Beatrix Potter (1971)
 Mr. Forbush and the Penguins (1971)
 Dulcima (1971)

Hammer co-productions 
 On the Buses (July 1971)
 Blood from the Mummy's Tomb (October 1971)
 Mutiny on the Buses (June 1972)
 Straight on Till Morning (July 1972)
 Demons of the Mind (November 1972)
 Man at the Top (1973) (AE/H)
 Love Thy Neighbour (July 1973)
 Holiday on the Buses (December 1973)
 To the Devil a Daughter (March 1976) (H)

MGM-EMI
 Get Carter (1971) (ME)
 The Go-Between (1971) (ME)
 The Boy Friend (1971) (ME)

Nat Cohen/Anglo-EMI 
 All the Way Up (1970) (AA)
 Spring and Port Wine (1970) (AA)
 Entertaining Mr Sloane (1970) (AA)
 The Body (1970) (AE)
 Percy (1971) (AE)
 Up Pompeii (1971) (AE)
 Villain (1971) (AE) – produced by Kanter, Ladd and Kastner
 Family Life (1971) (AE) – directed by Ken Loach
 Up the Chastity Belt (1972)
 Steptoe and Son (1972)
 I Am a Dancer (1972) (AE)
 Afternoon of a Champion (1972) (AE) (documentary)
 Up the Front (1972) (AE)
 Henry VIII and His Six Wives (1972) (AE)
 Endless Night (1972)
 Our Miss Fred (1972) (AE)
 Fear Is the Key (1972) – produced by Kanter, Ladd and Kastner (AE) (Dist by P in USA)
 Never Mind the Quality Feel the Width (1973)
 Baxter! (1973) (AE)
 Steptoe and Son Ride Again (1973)
 The Final Programme (1973) (AE)
 The Dove (1974) (D)
 Our Cissy (1974) (short)
 Stardust (1974) (AE)
 Murder on the Orient Express (1974) (AE)
 Sunday in the Country (1974) (D)
 Monty Python and the Holy Grail (1975)
 All Creatures Great and Small (1975)
 Trick or Treat? (1976) (abandoned)
 The Likely Lads (1976)
 Spanish Fly (1976) (D)
 It Shouldn't Happen to a Vet (1976)
 Aces High (1976) (D)
 Seven Nights in Japan (1976) (P)
 Sweeney! (1977)
 Cross of Iron (1977) (A-E)
 Twenty Five Years (1977) (documentary)
 Welcome to Blood City (1977)

Co-productions with Columbia 
 Nickelodeon (December 1976) - also with British Lion
 The Greatest (May 1977) – also with British Lion
 The Deep (June 1977)
 Close Encounters of the Third Kind (November 1977) 
 The Cheap Detective (June 1978)

Michael Deeley and Barry Spikings regime 
 Silver Bears (1977)
 Sweeney 2 (1978)
 Warlords of Atlantis (1978) 
 Convoy (1978) – with United Artists
 The Driver (1978) – with 20th Century Fox
 Death on the Nile (1978) 
 The Deer Hunter (1978) – with Universal

TV movies 
 The Amazing Howard Hughes (April 1977)
 The Girl Called Hatter Fox (October 1977)
 Special Olympics (February 1978)
 Forever (January 1978)
 Deadman's Curve (February 1978)
 Just Me and You (May 1978) 
 One in a Million: The Ron LeFlore Story (September 1978)
 Betrayal (November 1978)
 Steel Cowboy (December 1978)
 Lawman Without a Gun (December 1978)
 Deathmoon (May 1978)
 Lawman Without a Gun (1978)
 The Cracker Factory (March 1979)
 S.O.S. Titanic (September 1979)
 Survival of Dana (1979)
 Can You Hear the Laughter? The Story of Freddie Prinze (September 1979)
 Orphan Train (December 1979)
 The Dances Goes On (1980)
 Sophia Loren: Her Own Story (October 1980)
 My Kidnapper, My Love (December 1980)
 The Killing of Randy Webster (1981)
 Broken Promise (1981)
 The Manions of America (1981)
 A Piano for Mrs. Cimino (February 1982)
 A Question of Honor (1982)
 Coming Out of the Ice (1982)
 Deadly Encounter (1982)
 The Legend of Walks Far Woman (May 1982) (filmed 1979)
 Packin' It In (1983)

Barry Spikings 
 Arabian Adventure (July 1979) – with British Lion – distributed by AFD
 The Crown Prince (1979)
 Can't Stop the Music (June 1980) – distributed by AFD
 The Awakening (October 1980) – with Orion – distributed by Warners
 Times Square (October 1980) – with Robert Stigwood, distributed by AFD
 The Elephant Man (October 1980) – with Brooksfilms – distributed by Columbia-EMI-Warner (UK), Paramount (US)
 The Jazz Singer (December 1980) – distributed by AFD
 The Mirror Crack'd (December 1980) – distributed by AFD
 Honky Tonk Freeway (August 1981) – distributed by AFD
 Evil Under the Sun (March 1982) – distributed by AFD
 Britannia Hospital (May 1982) – with British Lion
 Frances (December 1982) – with Brooksfilms, distributed by Universal
 Second Thoughts (February 1983) – distributed by Universal
 Bad Boys (March 1983) – distributed by Universal
 Tender Mercies (Mar 1983) – distributed by Universal
 Strange Invaders (Sep 1983) – distributed by Orion
 Cross Creek (May 1983) – with Universal, distributed by AFD, Universal
 Handgun (May 1983, produced in 1981)

Verity Lambert 
 Slayground (December 1983)
 Comfort and Joy (August 1984)
 Not for Publication (November 1984)
 A Passage to India (December 1984) 
 Morons from Outer Space (March 1985)
 Restless Natives (June 1985)
 Dreamchild (October 1985)
 Wild Geese II (October 1985)
 The Holcroft Covenant (October 1985)
 Highlander (March 1986)
 Clockwise (March 1986)
 Link (March 1986)

Later films 
 The Manhattan Project (June 1986) (TESE)
 It Couldn't Happen Here (July 1988)
 Interstella 5555: The 5tory of the 5ecret 5tar 5ystem (May 2003) (D) (credited as "Virgin Music", a member of the EMI Group")

 AA = co-production with Anglo-Amalgamated
 ABPC = produced by Associated British Picture Corporation
 AE = as Anglo-EMI
 AFD = distributed by Associated Film Distributors
 C = co-production with Columbia Pictures
 D = distributor only
 H = co-production with Hammer Film Productions
 MGM = co-production with Metro-Goldwyn-Mayer
 Orion = co-production with Orion Pictures
 P = co-production with Paramount Pictures
 TESE = as Thorn EMI Screen Entertainment
 U = co-production with Universal
 UA = co-production with United Artists
 WB = co-production with Warner Bros.

References 

 Forbes, Bryan, A Divided Life, Mandarin Paperbacks, 1993
 Walker, Alexander, Hollywood England, Harrap and Stein, 1974
 Walker, Alexander, National Heroes: British Cinema in the Seventies and Eighties, Harrap, 1985
 Walker, Alexander, Icons in the Fire: The Rise and Fall of Practically Everyone in the British Film Industry 1984–2000, Orion Books, 2005

External links 

1969 establishments in England
1986 disestablishments in England
British companies established in 1969
British companies disestablished in 1986
Mass media companies established in 1969
Mass media companies disestablished in 1986
EMI
Film production companies of the United Kingdom
The Cannon Group, Inc.